Giles Grendey (1693-1780) was a British furniture designer. His work can be seen at the Metropolitan Museum of Art in New York City.

References

1693 births
1780 deaths
English furniture designers